Lipan is a city in northwest Hood County, Texas, United States. The population was 430 at the 2010 census. It is part of the Granbury, Texas Micropolitan Statistical Area.

Geography

Lipan is located at  (32.518623, –98.045294).

Climate

The climate in this area is characterized by relatively high temperatures and evenly distributed precipitation throughout the year.

Demographics

As of the census of 2000, there were 425 people, 175 households, and 114 families residing in the city. The population density was 400.9 people per square mile (154.8/km). There were 204 housing units at an average density of 192.4/sq mi (74.3/km). The racial makeup of the city was 98.12% White, 0.94% Native American, 0.47% from other races, and 0.47% from two or more races. Hispanic or Latino of any race were 7.29% of the population.

There were 175 households, out of which 30.3% had children under the age of 18 living with them, 53.1% were married couples living together, 11.4% had a female householder with no husband present, and 34.3% were non-families. 29.7% of all households were made up of individuals, and 18.9% had someone living alone who was 65 years of age or older. The average household size was 2.43 and the average family size was 3.03.

In the city, the population was spread out, with 26.1% under the age of 18, 8.2% from 18 to 24, 26.4% from 25 to 44, 20.9% from 45 to 64, and 18.4% who were 65 years of age or older. The median age was 37 years. For every 100 females, there were 87.2 males. For every 100 females age 18 and over, there were 85.8 males.

The median income for a household in the city was $32,333, and the median income for a family was $50,938. Males had a median income of $29,091 versus $17,333 for females. The per capita income for the city was $15,863. About 0.9% of families and 6.1% of the population were below the poverty line, including none of those under age 18 and 12.3% of those age 65 or over.

Education
The City of Lipan is served by the Lipan Independent School District.

References

Granbury micropolitan area
Cities in Texas
Cities in Hood County, Texas